Ardonis is a genus of moths in the family Geometridae.

Species
Ardonis chlorophilata (Walker, 1863)
Ardonis dentifera Warren, 1906
Ardonis filicata (Swinhoe, 1892)
Ardonis malachitis (Warren, 1903)
Ardonis thaumasta (Prout, 1935)

References

Eupitheciini
Geometridae genera